Alfred George Eckhold (28 December 1885 – 24 October 1931) was an Australian-New Zealand sportsman who played first-class cricket for Otago and represented the All-Blacks at rugby union.

Career

Rugby career
Eckhold, a 66 kg five-eighth, was originally from Australia and came to New Zealand when he was a teenager. He returned to his country of birth in 1907, with the New Zealand national rugby union team. Eckhold made three appearances on the tour, against NSW in Sydney and twice against Queensland in Brisbane. When back home in New Zealand, Eckhold played with the Southern Rugby Club in Dunedin and for Otago. In the 1920s he was a prominent rugby referee around the country and officiated in some Ranfurly Shield matches. His son in law, Harry Simon, was also an All Black.

Cricket career
He had made his first-class cricket debut in 1907, when he lined up against the touring Marylebone Cricket Club which was filled with experienced international cricketers. He accounted for himself well though, making 41 in his maiden innings, the second top score for Otago. He seemed to perform well against good opponents as he was again one of his team's best batsmen when they took on the Australian cricket team at Carisbrook in 1910, with innings of 27 and 26.

Four of his first-class matches were in the Plunket Shield

Eckhold made his highest score of 60 not out, against Wellington at Basin Reserve in 1915, after making a duck in the first innings. His effort, coupled with an unbeaten century from captain and England Test cricketer Jack Crawford, allowed Otago to hold on for a draw and it also set an eight wicket record for the team.

Personal life
Eckhold was born at Adelaide in South Australia in 1885. He worked as a maltster. He died, aged 45, at Dunedin in 1931.

References

External links

1885 births
1931 deaths
Australian emigrants to New Zealand
New Zealand rugby union referees
New Zealand rugby union players
New Zealand international rugby union players
New Zealand cricketers
Otago cricketers